A Lighter Shade of Brown (LSOB) was an American hip hop duo from Riverside, California best known for their 1990 hit single "On a Sunday Afternoon", a success in the U.S., written by songwriters and musicians David Dunson and Micah Carson.

History
LSOB was formed in 1989 by One Dope Mexican (Robert Gutierrez) and  Don't Try To Xerox (Bobby Ramirez). They recorded demos and landed a record deal soon after with small independent label Pump. Their debut album, 1990's Brown and Proud, brought the group their lone Top 40 single in the U.S. with "On A Sunday Afternoon," which contained samples of The Young Rascals' 1967 hit "Groovin' " and Tommy James and the Shondells' 1969 hit "Crystal Blue Persuasion", and peaked at #39 on the Billboard Hot 100. The song also went to #1 for 2 weeks in New Zealand.

The duo provided songs for Latino-market movies such as Mi Vida Loca and I Like It Like That following the release of their second LP, 1992's Hip Hop Locos, which failed to chart. The success of "Sunday Afternoon" nonetheless resulted in Mercury Records signing the group and releasing their third disc, Layin' in the Cut, in 1994. The record did not sell as well as was hoped, peaking at #184 on the Billboard 200 albums chart.

LSOB went on a temporary hiatus, returning in 1997 on indie with Greenside Records. Their self-titled fourth album featured guest appearances from Rappin' 4-Tay and Dwayne Wiggins of Tony! Toni! Toné!.

1999 marked the last of their releases, including a greatest hits album and a non-charting single, "Sunny Day." That year, Gutierrez became a DJ at  San Bernardino radio station KGGI and Bobby carried on touring as LSOB and working on new music. A decade later, on October 18, 2011, the album It's A Wrap was released through Illuminated Entertainment Group. The album was produced by Playalitical. Ramirez is the only one out of the group that raps on it, as sort of a one-man Lighter Shade of Brown. The album's radio single "Call Me Over" was produced by Fingazz and featured Playalitical and Zig Zag of the NB Ridaz. A music video was also filmed and released for the song.

On July 18, 2016, Don't Try To Xerox died after being in a coma for 11 days.

Discography

Studio albums

Compilation albums
Greatest Hits (1999)

Singles

References

Hip hop groups from California
Musical groups established in 1990
Musical groups disestablished in 2016
American rappers of Mexican descent
Musical groups from Riverside County, California
Culture of Riverside, California
Hip hop duos
Chicano rap
American musical duos